NGC 604 is an H II region inside the Triangulum Galaxy. It was discovered by William Herschel on September 11, 1784. It is among the largest H II regions in the Local Group of galaxies; at the galaxy's estimated distance of 2.7 million light-years, its longest diameter is roughly 1,520 light years (~460 parsecs), over 40 times the size of the visible portion of the Orion Nebula. It is over 6,300 times more luminous than the Orion Nebula, and if it were at the same distance it would outshine Venus. Its gas is ionized by a cluster of massive stars at its center with 200 stars of spectral type O and WR, a mass of 105 solar masses, and an age of 3.5 million years; however, unlike the Large Magellanic Cloud's Tarantula Nebula central cluster (R136), NGC 604's one is much less compact and more similar to a large stellar association.

See also
Tarantula Nebula
List of largest nebulae

References

Some data in the table was updated from Sue French's column "Deep-sky Wonders", in the January 2006 issue of Sky & Telescope, p. 83.

External links 

 Nebula NGC 604 @ SEDS Messier pages
 
 

H II regions
Triangulum (constellation)
0604
Triangulum Galaxy
17840911
Star-forming regions